WAAK-LP is an adult standards-formatted broadcast radio station licensed to Boynton, Georgia, serving the Boynton/Ringgold area.  WAAK-LP is owned and operated by Boynton Educational Radio, Inc.

External links
waakradio.com
 

AAK-LP
AAK-LP
Adult standards radio stations in the United States
Radio stations established in 2005